The 2016 Washington Republican presidential primary was held on May 24 in the U.S. state of Washington as one of the Republican Party's primaries ahead of the 2016 presidential election. The only candidate on the ballot who had not withdrawn was Donald Trump.

The Democratic Party held their Washington caucuses on March 26, and a non-binding primary in Washington on the same day as the Republican primary. No other primaries were scheduled for that day. Following Trump's victory in Washington and a surge in his support from unbound North Dakota delegates, the Associated Press (on May 26) announced that Trump had passed the threshold of 1,237 delegates required to guarantee his nomination.

List of delegates
The Washington Republican State Convention was held May 19–21, 2016 in Pasco, WA. Delegates to the Republican National Convention were elected from among the approximately 3,000 delegates and alternates who had been elected to the Washington Republican State Convention.

Opinion polling

Results

See also
 2016 Washington Democratic presidential caucuses

References

Washington
Republican primary
Washington (state) Republican caucuses
May 2016 events in the United States